Poopó Municipality is the first municipal section of the Poopó Province in the Oruro Department, Bolivia. Its capital is Poopó.

Geography 
The municipality lies east of the Desaguadero River where it connects Uru Uru Lake and Poopó Lake.

Some of the highest mountains of the municipality are listed below:

Subdivision 
The municipality is divided into three cantons.
Coripata Canton
Poopó Canton
Venta y Media Canton

Languages 
The languages spoken in the Poopó Municipality are mainly Spanish, Quechua and Aymara .

References 

 obd.descentralizacion.gov.bo

External links 
 Map of the Poopó Province

Municipalities of Oruro Department